Foping is a county under the administration and in the northeast corner of Hanzhong City, in the south of Shaanxi province, China.

The county was first established in 1824.

It has been called the 'home of dogwood', having over 100,000 Mu (ca. 162 sq km.) of dogwood forests. The Qinling panda was first discovered in Foping.

Administrative divisions
As 2019, Foping County is divided to 1 subdistrict and 6 towns.
Subdistricts
 Yuanjiazhuang Subdistrict

Towns

 Chenjiaba
 Daheba 
 Xichahe
 Yueba
 Changjiaoba
 Shidunhe

Climate

References

County-level divisions of Shaanxi
Hanzhong